The Avenging Trail is a 1917 American silent drama film directed by Francis Ford and starring Harold Lockwood, Sally Crute, and Joseph Dailey. It was released on December 31, 1917.

Plot
Gaston Olaf returns home from college and finds out that his father has been murdered, and his timberlands stolen.  To exact revenge, he becomes a lumberjack.  One day he saves Rose Havens from the unwanted attention of Lefty Red. Impressed with the young man, Dave Taggert replaces Red with Olaf as his lumber supervisor. When Olaf learns of Taggert's plan to cheat Rose out of payment for the lumber his men have felled on her property, Olaf stands up to his boss and demands that Rose receive payment. Olaf refuses to make delivery of the wood until payment is made.

Taggert pretends to concede to Olaf's demands, and makes payment to Rose. However, he orders one of his men, Lefty Red, to go to Rose's place of business and steal the money back. Olaf foils the robbery and he and Lefty Red struggle, with Olaf eventually fatally wounding the Red. Before he dies, Red confesses to having killed Olaf's father at the behest of Taggert.

Olaf exposes Taggert's thieving ways to the entire town, and the two men fight, after which Olaf simply leaves Taggert's fate up to the angry vengeful townspeople. Having saved Rose, the two pledge their love for one another and vow to marry.

Cast list
 Harold Lockwood as Gaston Olaf
 Sally Crute as Rose Havens
 Joseph Dailey as Tom Pine
 Walter Lewis as Devil Dave Taggert
 Louis Wolheim as Lefty Red
 William Clifford as William Hale
 Warren Cook as Dr. Saunders
 Lettie Ford as Mrs. Havens
 Artie Ortego as Taggart's Indian

Production
In early December it was announced that Sally Crute had been engaged as the female lead in the film, to star opposite Harold Lockwood.  At the same time it was revealed that Francis Ford would be the director, with producing duties carried out by Fred Balshofer.  Also in early December Metro announced that The Avenging Trail would be its final release of the year, scheduling it for December 31. By December 8, all the interior filming had been completed, and work was begun on the exterior scenes. Those exterior scene were shot at a lumber camp near North Conway, New Hampshire.  While on location, the film's assistant director, Johnnie Waters, was called to active duty in the U.S. Army.  He left the location and reported for duty on December 7.

The film was released on December 31, 1917.

Reception
The Exhibitors Herald gave the film a mediocre review. They felt the script was "mediocre" and "hackneyed", but felt the pace of the film was good, and the cinematography was excellent. They were also complimentary of the cast, singling out Lockwood's performance.

References

External links 
 
 
 

Films directed by Francis Ford
Metro Pictures films
Silent American drama films
American silent feature films
American black-and-white films
1917 drama films
1917 films
1910s English-language films
1910s American films